Josef Kraft (8 February 1921 – 16 October 1994) was a German military aviator in the Luftwaffe during World War II and an officer in the postwar German Air Force. As a fighter ace, he was credited with 56 aerial victories claimed in 129 combat missions, making him the thirteenth, a shared distinction, most successful night fighter pilot in the history of aerial warfare. All of his victories were claimed in Defense of the Reich missions, the majority against the Royal Air Force's (RAF) Bomber Command and United States Army Air Forces (USAAF) on the Western Front and four against the Soviet Air Forces on the Eastern Front.

Born in Vienna, Kraft grew up in the First Austrian Republic, the Federal State of Austria and Nazi Germany. Following graduation from school, he joined the military service in 1940, initially serving with an anti-aircraft artillery he was later trained as a pilot. In 1942, he was posted to  Nachtjagdgeschwader 4 (NJG 4—4th Night Fighter Wing) and to  Nachtjagdgeschwader 5 (NJG 5—5th Night Fighter Wing) in 1943. Kraft claimed his first aerial victory on the night of 27/28 August 1943. In May 1944, his Gruppe was subordinated to  Nachtjagdgeschwader 6 (NJG 6—6th Night Fighter Wing) based in Hungary. Following his 44th aerial victory, he was awarded the Knight's Cross of the Iron Cross on 30 September 1944, shortly after, he was appointed squadron leader of 7. Staffel (7th squadron) of NJG 6. Kraft claimed his last aerial victories on 22/23 March 1945 and was awarded the Knight's Cross of the Iron Cross with Oak Leaves 17 April.

Following the rearmament of the Federal Republic of Germany, Kraft joined the German Air Force in July 1956. He died on 16 October 1994 in Fürstenfeldbruck.

Early life and career
Kraft, the son of a tram driver, was born on 8 February 1921 in Vienna, the capital of First Austrian Republic. He joined the military service of the Wehrmacht on 11 April 1940, initially serving with Flak-Regiment 42 (42nd anti-aircraft artillery regiment) of the Luftwaffe. Kraft volunteered for flight service and was promoted to Oberfähnrich (officer candidate) on 1 July 1941. Following night fighter flight training,  he was promoted to Leutnant (second lieutenant) on 1 November 1941 and continued to serve with a Luftwaffe training unit 16 August 1942.

World War II

World War II in Europe had begun on Friday, 1 September 1939, when German forces invaded Poland. Following the 1939 aerial Battle of the Heligoland Bight, Royal Air Force (RAF) attacks shifted to the cover of darkness, initiating the Defence of the Reich campaign. By mid-1940, Generalmajor (Brigadier General) Josef Kammhuber had established a night air defense system dubbed the Kammhuber Line. It consisted of a series of control sectors equipped with radars and searchlights and an associated night fighter. Each sector named a Himmelbett (canopy bed) would direct the night fighter into visual range with target bombers. In 1941, the Luftwaffe started equipping night fighters with airborne radar such as the Lichtenstein radar. This airborne radar did not come into general use until early 1942.

Night fighter career
In October 1942, Kraft was posted to II. Gruppe (2nd group) of Nachtjagdgeschwader 4 (NJG 4—4th Night Fighter Wing). In January 1943, he was again transferred then serving with II. Gruppe of Nachtjagdgeschwader 5 (NJG 5—5th Night Fighter Wing).

Kraft was promoted to Oberleutnant (first lieutenant) on 1 February 1944 and received the Honor Goblet of the Luftwaffe on 31 March. In May, II. Gruppe was subordinated to Nachtjagdgeschwader 6 (NJG 6—6th Night Fighter Wing) and moved Hungary on the southern sector of the Eastern Front. He was awarded the German Cross in Gold on 23 July 1944. By September 1944, his number of aerial victories had increased to 44 for which he received the Knight's Cross of the Iron Cross on 30 September.

In February and March 1945, he claimed his last aerial victories, increasing his total to 56. For which he was awarded the Knight's Cross of the Iron Cross with Oak Leaves on 17 April, the 838th officer or soldier of the Wehrmacht so honored. At the end of war he was taken prisoner of war by British forces and was released in August 1945.

Later life
Following the Wiederbewaffnung (rearmament) of the Federal Republic of Germany, Kraft joined the German Air Force in 1956. From 1 October 1 to 31 March 1980, he commanded the Luftwaffenversorgungsregiment 2 and retired holding the rank of Oberst (colonel).  Kraft died on 16 October 1994 in Fürstenfeldbruck.

Summary of career

Aerial victory claims
According to US historian David T. Zabecki, Kraft was credited with 56 aerial victories. Obermaier lists Kraft with 56 nocturnal aerial victories, four of which on the Eastern Front, claimed in 129 combat missions. Foreman, Parry and Mathews, authors of Luftwaffe Night Fighter Claims 1939 – 1945, researched the German Federal Archives and found records for 56 nocturnal victory claims Mathews and Foreman also published Luftwaffe Aces — Biographies and Victory Claims, listing Kraft with 51 claims, plus five further unconfirmed claims.

Awards
 Iron Cross (1939)
 2nd Class (1 September 1943)
 1st Class (5 November 1943)
 Honour Goblet of the Luftwaffe (Ehrenpokal der Luftwaffe) on 1 May 1944 as Leutnant and pilot
 Front Flying Clasp of the Luftwaffe in Gold (18 February 1945)
 German Cross in Gold on 23 July 1944 as Oberleutnant in the 8./Nachtjagdgeschwader 6
 Knight's Cross of the Iron Cross with Oak Leaves
 Knight's Cross on 30 September 1944 as Oberleutnant and pilot in the II./Nachtjagdgeschwader 6
 838th Oak Leaves on 17 April 1945 as Hauptmann and Staffelkapitän of the 12./Nachtjagdgeschwader 1

Promotions

Notes

References

Citations

Bibliography

 
 
 
 
 
 
 
 
 
 
 
 
 
 
 
 
 
 
 

1921 births
1994 deaths
Austrian military personnel of World War II
German World War II flying aces
German Air Force personnel
Recipients of the Gold German Cross
Recipients of the Knight's Cross of the Iron Cross with Oak Leaves
Military personnel from Vienna
German prisoners of war in World War II held by the United Kingdom